This is a list of all (former) Member of the European Parliament for the Democrats 66 (D66)
Source:

Seats in the European Parliament

Alphabetical

Delegation members of the European Parliament (1958-79)

Elected members of the European Parliament (from 1979)
Current members of the European Parliament are in bold.

European Parliament periods

1958-1979 (Delegation to the European Parliament) 

 Doeke Eisma
 Maarten Engwirda

1979-1984 

2 Seats:
 Aar de Goede
 Suzanne Dekker (till 9 June 1981)
 Doeke Eisma (from 19 June 1981)

1984-1989 

0 Seats:

1989-1994 

1 Seat:
 Jan-Willem Bertens

1994-1999 

4 Seats:
 Jan-Willem Bertens
 Johanna Boogerd-Quaak
 Laurens Jan Brinkhorst (till 7 juni 1999)
 Doeke Eisma

1999-2004 

2 Seats:
 Bob van den Bos
 Lousewies van der Laan (till 29 January 2003)
 Johanna Boogerd-Quaak (from 5 February 2003)

2004-2009 

1 Seat:
 Sophie in 't Veld

2009-2014 

3 Seats:
 Gerben-Jan Gerbrandy
 Marietje Schaake
 Sophie in 't Veld

2014-2019 

4 Seats:
 Gerben-Jan Gerbrandy
 Matthijs van Miltenburg
 Marietje Schaake
 Sophie in 't Veld

2019-2024 

2 Seats:
 Sophie in 't Veld (top candidate)
 Samira Rafaela

References

Main